Zhai is the Mandarin pinyin romanization of the Chinese surname written  in Chinese character. It is romanized Chai in Wade–Giles, and Chak in Cantonese. It is listed 292nd in the Song dynasty classic text Hundred Family Surnames. As of 2008, it is the 120th most common surname in China, shared by 1.4 million people.

Notable people
 Zhai Huang (翟璜; fl. 4th century BC), Prime Minister of Marquess Wen of Wei
 Zhai Fangjin (翟方進; died 7 AD), Prime Minister of the Han dynasty
 Zhai Liao (died 391), founder of the Zhai Wei state
 Zhai Zhao (died 393), son of Zhai Liao, the second and final ruler of Zhai Wei
 Zhai Rang (died 617), Sui dynasty rebel leader
 Zhai Wang (翟汪; 1877–1941), Republic of China politician, Governor of Guangdong province
 Zhai Wenxuan (翟文選; 1878–1950), Republic of China politician, Governor of Liaoning province
 Zhai Yiwo (翟一我; 1921–2007), journalist and translator
 Zhai Yusheng (翟裕生; born 1930), geologist
 Zhai Xiangjun (1939–2019), translator and educator
 Zhai Wanchen (翟万臣; born 1949), actor
 Zhai Zhenhua (born 1951), writer
 Zhai Jun (born 1954), Chinese ambassador to France
 Zhai Yongming (born 1955), poet
 Zhai Zhigang (born 1966), astronaut
 Zhai Chao (born 1971), female Olympic handball player
 Zhai Yanpeng (born 1982), football player
 William Chak or Zhai Weilian (born 1985), Hong Kong actor
 Zhai Ling (翟凌; born 1987), model
 Zhai Tianlin (born 1987), actor
 Chak Ting Fung or Zhai Tingfeng (born 1989), Hong Kong football player
 Zhai Xiaochuan (born 1993), Chinese basketball player

References

Chinese-language surnames
Individual Chinese surnames